Marin Vidošević (born 9 October 1986) is a Croatian footballer who currently is on a free agent.

References

External links
 

1986 births
Living people
Association football defenders
Croatian footballers
HNK Trogir players
NK Imotski players
NK Hrvatski Dragovoljac players
NK Zagreb players
Warriors FC players
HNK Zmaj Makarska players
FC Gießen players
Borussia Fulda players
NK Croatia Zmijavci players
Croatian Football League players
Singapore Premier League players
Regionalliga players
First Football League (Croatia) players
Croatian expatriate footballers
Expatriate footballers in Singapore
Croatian expatriate sportspeople in Singapore
Expatriate footballers in Germany
Croatian expatriate sportspeople in Germany